{|
{{Infobox ship image
|Ship image=Suffren-IMG 8647.jpg
|Ship caption=1/20th scale model of Suffren, lead ship of Tilsitts class, on display at the Musée national de la Marine
}}

|}

The Tilsitt''' was a 90-gun Ship of the line of the French Navy. She was the second ship in French service named in honour of the Treaties of Tilsit.

 Career 
Started as Diadème, Tilsitt'' was transformed into a steam and sail ship of the line while still on keel. She took part in the Crimean War and in the French intervention in Mexico before becoming a prison hulk for prisoners of the Paris Commune.

From 1873, she replaced Fleurus as the hulk serving as headquarters to the French naval division of Indochina in Saigon.

Notes, citations, and references

Notes

Citations

References

 90-guns ships-of-the-line

Ships of the line of the French Navy
Ships built in France
1854 ships
Crimean War naval ships of France
Suffren-class ships of the line